Paine College is a private, historically black Methodist college in Augusta, Georgia.  It is affiliated with the United Methodist Church and Christian Methodist Episcopal Church.  Paine College offers undergraduate degrees in the liberal arts, business administration, and education through residential, commuter, and off-site programs.  The college is accredited by the Transnational Association of Christian Colleges and Schools (TRACS).

Campus

Paine College has a  campus in the heart of Augusta. Most of its buildings, including residence halls, classroom buildings, and the library, are located in the main campus area. The athletic field, gymnasium, tennis court, and the chapel/music building are included in the rear campus area. The Collins-Calloway Library and Resources Center houses the Paine College Digital Collections, which feature historical images of Paine College and oral history interviews of Paine College alumni and presidents.

A historic district within the campus was listed on the National Register of Historic Places on December 26, 2012,  for its contributions to education and  African-American heritage.

Athletics
Paine College's athletic teams are nicknamed as the Lions. The college currently competes as a member of the National Christian Collegiate Athletic Association (NCCAA). Men's sports include baseball and basketball; women's sports include basketball, softball, and volleyball.

Paine formerly competed in the Division II level of the National Collegiate Athletic Association (NCAA), primarily in the Southern Intercollegiate Athletic Conference (SIAC) from 1985–86 to 2020–21.

The college's football team was dropped after the 1963 season, but returned to play in 2014. In their first season back, the football team finished 2-8 before the program was again shut down.

Accreditation and finances
The college is experiencing financial issues and had its regional accreditation revoked by the Southern Association of Colleges and Schools (SACS) in 2016.

In November 2015, following an initial recommendation from SACS to revoke its accreditation, Paine College launched the "Build it Back Campaign", which raised over half a million dollars in six months. This was to support its fundraising goal of $3.5 million, of which $2.5 million in cash was raised.  The college plans to use the money to offset the debt of $5.4 million.  Following a March 2016 onsite visit, SACS found the college in compliance with one of the standards that was previously problematic, leaving a total of three standards in question: financial resources, financial stability, and control of sponsored research/external funds.  In May, the college celebrated meeting its fundraising goal.  However, one month later SACS recommended that the college lose its regional accreditation. The college unsuccessfully appealed to the accreditor and federal courts.

The college subsequently applied for and was granted candidate status with the Transnational Association of Christian Colleges and Schools (TRACS) in 2018.

Notable alumni

This is a list of notable alumni of Paine Institute and/or Paine College.

See also

List of historically black colleges and universities

References

External links

Official athletics website

 
Educational institutions established in 1882
Buildings and structures in Augusta, Georgia
Education in Augusta, Georgia
1882 establishments in Georgia (U.S. state)
Private universities and colleges in Georgia (U.S. state)
Historically black universities and colleges in the United States